Tine Kavčič (born 16 February 1994) is a Slovenian footballer who plays for Italian side Virtus Bolzano as a defender.

References

External links
 
NZS profile 
National team profile 

1994 births
Living people

Association football defenders
Slovenian footballers
Slovenia under-21 international footballers
ND Gorica players
NK Brda players
NK Opatija players
Slovenian PrvaLiga players
Slovenian Second League players
First Football League (Croatia) players
Second Football League (Croatia) players
Slovenian expatriate footballers
Expatriate footballers in Italy
Slovenian expatriate sportspeople in Italy
Expatriate footballers in Croatia
Slovenian expatriate sportspeople in Croatia